The Journal of Biological Education is a quarterly peer-reviewed academic journal covering biology education. It was established in 1967, is owned by the Royal Society of Biology, and is published by Routledge. The editor-in-chief is Ian Kinchin (University of Surrey). According to the Journal Citation Reports, the journal has a 2014 impact factor of 0.324, ranking it 32nd out of 37 journals in the category "Education, Scientific Disciplines".

References

External links

Biology journals
Academic journals associated with learned and professional societies of the United Kingdom
Publications established in 1967
Routledge academic journals
Quarterly journals
English-language journals
Science education journals